The Division of Parramatta is an Australian electoral division in the state of New South Wales. The division was created in 1900 and was one of the original 65 divisions contested at the first federal election. It is named for the locality of Parramatta. The name Parramatta has been sourced to an Aboriginal word for the area. The Darug people had lived in the area for many generations, and regarded the area as a food bowl, rich in food from the river and forests. They called the area Baramada or Burramatta ("Parramatta") which means "the place where the eels lie down".

The division is based in the western suburbs of Sydney. Besides Parramatta, it includes Camellia, Clyde, Constitution Hill, Dundas Valley, Granville, Harris Park, Holroyd, Mays Hill, North Parramatta, Oatlands, Rosehill, Rydalmere, Telopea, Wentworthville, Westmead; and parts of Carlingford, Dundas, Ermington, Guildford, Merrylands, North Rocks, Northmead, Old Toongabbie, Pendle Hill, South Granville, South Wentworthville, and Toongabbie.

Parramatta is a diverse electorate with large immigrant communities from India and China, and has a higher than average university education rate according to the 2016 census.

The current Member for the Division of Parramatta, since the 2022 federal election, is Andrew Charlton, a member of the Australian Labor Party.

Geography
Since 1984, federal electoral division boundaries in Australia have been determined at redistributions by a redistribution committee appointed by the Australian Electoral Commission. Redistributions occur for the boundaries of divisions in a particular state, and they occur every seven years, or sooner if a state's representation entitlement changes or when divisions of a state are malapportioned.

History

As originally created, it covered the outer northwestern suburbs of Sydney, though that city's dramatic growth made it an entirely urban seat after World War II.  For most of the first seven decades after Federation, it included a large amount of conservative-leaning territory that usually swamped Parramatta itself, which has historically been a working-class area.  As a result, the seat was held by the Liberals and their predecessors for all but one term from Federation until 1977.

A redistribution ahead of the 1977 election split Parramatta almost in half.  Most of the wealthier eastern half became the comfortably safe Liberal seat of Dundas.  Most of the western half, including the bulk of the Parramatta LGA, became the core of a marginal Labor seat that retained the Parramatta name, as per Australian Electoral Commission guidelines that require the names of original Federation electorates to be preserved where possible. However, the reconfigured Parramatta was anchored in traditionally pro-Labor territory in western Sydney. Parramatta's Liberal incumbent, Phillip Ruddock, opted to follow most of his base into Dundas, allowing his 1975 challenger, John Brown to become only the second Labor member ever to win Parramatta.

Since then, it has been located between Labor's traditional heartland of western Sydney and the traditional Liberal stronghold of the North Shore.  As a result, whenever the seat is redistributed, a shift of a few kilometres to the west or east can radically alter its political landscape.

Most recently, the 2006 redistribution shifted Parramatta from marginally Labor to notionally marginally Liberal (as defined by the Australian Electoral Commission). Nevertheless, as was widely expected  at the 2007 federal election, the incumbent Labor member, Julie Owens, held the seat ahead of Liberal candidate Colin Robinson, a member of the Electrical Trades Union, with an increased majority.

Owens has subsequently been re-elected at the 2010, 2013, 2016 elections, and 2019. Owens' win in the seat in 2004 marked the first time that the Liberals and their predecessors had won government without also winning Parramatta.

Prominent members of Parramatta over the years have included (Sir) Joseph Cook, a former Prime Minister; (Sir) Garfield Barwick and Nigel Bowen, both of whom served as Attorney-General before moving to senior judicial position, Barwick as Chief Justice of the High Court. Ruddock, a former Attorney-General and Immigration Minister also represented the seat (though he was the member for Berowra by then); as did Brown, a former Sports Minister.

Members

Election results

References

External links
 Division of Parramatta - Australian Electoral Commission

Electoral divisions of Australia
Constituencies established in 1901
1901 establishments in Australia